David "Dusty" Hudock (born September 4, 1972 in Cleveland, Ohio) is a retired American soccer goalkeeper. Hudock began his career in the APSL, playing primarily for the Seattle Sounders, before moving to the Charleston Battery of the A-League and USL First Division.

Career

Youth and college
Hudock grew up in Phoenix, Arizona and played youth soccer for CISCO Arsenal. He played at the University of Washington from 1991 to 1993, where he was named to the All American Second Team in 1992 and 1993.  He was also a member of the US soccer team at the 1991 World Student Games held in Sheffield.  At some point during his collegiate career, Hudock also played for the Tucson Amigos of the USISL.

Professional
Hudock initially began playing soccer at the college level at the University of Washington, until turning professional by signing with the Seattle Sounders of the A-League in 1994. During his tenure with the Sounders, he primarily served as a backup for then starting goalie Marcus Hahnemann which resulted in minimal appearances for the young goalkeeper. Despite not recording much minutes on the field, he did receive his first piece of silverware as Seattle would become the A-League Champions in 1995. In 1996, the Colorado Rapids drafted Hudock in the second round of the 1996 MLS Inaugural Player Draft. At Colorado, he received the chance to experience being a starter during the commence of earlier part of the season, but was soon after replaced by Chris Woods, and returned to Seattle in 1997. Ironically soon after his release from Colorado, the club would sign his former teammate Hahnemann as his successor, which allowed Hudock to complete for a starting goalkeeper position in Seattle. Hudock superb performances during the 1997 campaign resulted in him to be awarded the A-League Goalkeeper of the Year award. After an exceptional showing at Seattle led him to be sign by the Chicago Fire on a loan, where it got Hudock a MLS championship.

In April 1998, he went on loan with the Colorado Rapids., while a late call-up during the playoffs by the Chicago Fire got Hudock an MLS championship ring as he was on the bench in the final.

During the time of the 1999 MLS draft it was presumed by many that Tampa Bay Mutiny would sign Hudock, but instead the team signed Scott Garlick. Dusty entered the MLS Draft and was picked up by the Miami Fusion. Hudock started the first three games of the season until usual starter Jeff Cassar returned from injury. Fusion waived Hudock, and he signed with the Charleston Battery on April 15, 1999.

In Charleston he earned a reputation for being a prime goalkeeper and an outstanding shot-stopper. His immense contributions brought Charleston to a great level of prestige among the league. During his tenure at Charleston he has established himself as the all-time leading goalkeeper for the Battery with 130 wins and a GAA of 1.08. His Battery records include 91 shutouts and 260 games started. He assisted the club by claiming their second A-League Championship and several Division titles; he was awarded for the second time in his career A-League Goalkeeper of the Year award in 2002. In February, 2010 he was ranked 16th in the USL First Division Top 25 of the Decade, which announced a list of the best and most influential players of the previous decade.

In 2000, he posted a career high season by recording 17 victories under his belt, as well receiving his first piece of silverware by winning the Division title. His 2002 season was exceptional, as he managed to finish as the league's leading goalkeeper with 13 shutouts that resulted in a GAA of 0.60. His remarkable season led to him being awarded the A-League Goalkeeper of the Year award, as well receiving the majority of his domestic club's team awards. Hudock would experience a tremendous season with Charleston in 2003, where he provided a pivotal role in the club's championship season. He recorded 11 shutouts that clinched the Southeast Division title and provided a playoff berth for the Battery. In the club's playoff round, Hudock posted three consecutive shutouts against the likes of the Rochester Rhinos, and including the final match against the Minnesota Thunder, which culminated in a 3-0 A-League Championship victory. For his dedication the club honoured him with the Charleston Battery MVP award for the second consecutive year in a row. The following season, Charleston produced a mediocre season because the majority of its championship winning squad went overseas to pursue new opportunities. Despite not making the post season, he led the club to the semifinals of the Lamar Hunt US Open Cup. In 2005, Hudock would pursue other club offers eventually signing with the Rochester Rhinos.

His tenure at Rochester met an unfavorable run for the goalkeeper, where he would primarily serve as a substitute to Scott Vallow. This prompted a return to South Carolina in 2006, where he was appointed club captain and once again played an important role in Charleston entry into the playoffs. In 2008, Hudock was part of the Charleston squad that made history in the US Open Cup, by becoming the second USL club in the MLS era of the tournament to reach the tournament championship, where their opponents were D.C. United. Unfortunately in the final, D.C. United came away with a 2-1 victory. During his time at the Battery he won the USL1 in 2003, Battery MVP 02,03,04 Battery defender of the year in 01 and 02 and USL Goalkeeper of the year in 02.

Coaching
Following his retirement Hudock settled in the Charleston area and has served as an assistant to Battery head coach Mike Anhaeuser in various capacities. As of 2015 Hudock is the head coach of the Battery's U-18 academy squad playing in the U.S. Soccer Development Academy.

Honors

Club

Seattle Sounders A-League Champions 1995

Charleston Battery
A-League Championship
 Champions (1): 2003

Individual
Charleston Battery MVP (3): 2002, 2003, 2004
Charleston Battery Defender of the Year (2): 2001, 2002
A-League
Goalkeeper of the Year (2): 1997, 2002

References

External links
Charleston Battery bio

1972 births
Living people
American soccer players
Association football goalkeepers
Soccer players from Arizona
Washington Huskies men's soccer players
USL First Division players
Seattle Sounders (1994–2008) players
Rochester New York FC players
Colorado Rapids players
Chicago Fire FC players
Miami Fusion players
Charleston Battery players
Tucson Amigos players
Major League Soccer players
A-League (1995–2004) players
American Professional Soccer League players
Colorado Rapids draft picks
Miami Fusion draft picks